Events in the year 1841 in Bolivia.

Incumbents
 President:
 José Miguel de Velasco (until 10 June)
 Sebastián Ágreda (provisional: 10 June 1841 – 9 July)
 Mariano Enrique Calvo (acting: 9 July – 22 September)
 Vacant (22–27 September)
 José Ballivián (starting 27 September)

Ongoing events 
 Peruvian-Bolivian War (1841–1842)

Events

June 
 10 June – President José Miguel de Velasco is ousted in a coup d'état by Sebastián Ágreda.

July 
 9 July – Ágreda delegates command to Mariano Enrique Calvo, pending the return of Andrés de Santa Cruz.

September 
 22 September – Calvo is ousted in a coup d'état by José Ballivián. 
 27 September – José Ballivián is sworn-in to the presidency after five days of uncertainty.

October 
 1 October – Peruvian-Bolivian War: Peruvian President Agustín Gamarra begin the march to Bolivia.
 2 October – Peruvian-Bolivian War: The Peruvian Army crosses the border onto Bolivian soil.
 15 October – Peruvian-Bolivian War: Peruvian forces occupy La Paz without a fight.
 29 October – Peruvian-Bolivian War – Battle of Mecapaca: Bolivian forces under Basilio Herrera attack those of Peru under Miguel de San Román but are repelled.

November 
 18 November – Peruvian-Bolivian War – Battle of Ingavi: The three competing Bolivian governments unite under Ballivián to defeat Gamarra.

Births

Deaths
 18 November – Agustín Gamarra, President of Peru (b. 1785)

Notes

Footnotes

Citations

Bibliography 

 
1800s in Bolivia
Bolivia
Bolivia
Years of the 19th century in Bolivia